Stuart France O'Connell (11 May 1935 – 2 August 2019) was the fifth Catholic Bishop of Rarotonga (1996–2011).

Early life
O'Connell was born on 11 May 1935 in Lower Hutt. He completed his education at St. Patrick's College, Silverstream in 1953 and in 1954 entered Mount St Mary’s Seminary. He was professed as a member of the Society of Mary on 11 February 1956, at Mt St Mary's Seminary, Greenmeadows, where his final profession took place in February 1959 and he was ordained a subdeacon in December 1959.

Priesthood
O'Connell was ordained to the deaconate in February 1960 and to the priesthood at Saints Peter and Paul Church, Lower Hutt, on 27 July 1960. After five years of teaching in New Zealand he was sent to Chanel College, Moamoa, Samoa, in 1966 as a teacher and spiritual director. After another period teaching and studying in New Zealand, he returned, in 1975, to Chanel College as Rector and remained there until 1982.

In 1983 and 1984 he studied at the Catholic University of America where he completed his MA. From 1985 to 1986, he taught at Mount St Mary’s Seminary, Greenmeadows. From 1986 to 1991, he was Vicar Provincial, and from 1992 to 1996 he was Provincial of the New Zealand Province of the Society of Mary.

Episcopacy
On 8 November 1995, O'Connell was appointed the Bishop of Rarotonga and was consecrated by Bishop Leamy SM, Cardinal Williams and Bishop Soane Lilo Foliaki SM, Bishop of Tonga, in St Joseph's Cathedral, Avarua, on 22 February 1996.

He oversaw a growing Roman Catholic population (by 2011 in excess of 3,000 in a total population of about 20,000 – mainly due to immigration from the Philippines and Fiji) with a complement of only seven priests (five on Rarotonga at Avarua, Matavera, Titikaveka and Arorangi and one each on Aitutaki, Atiu, and Mauke (islands). He was able to obtain priests from overseas and to augment the number of local-born priests. He was able to keep open and refurbish the Catholic schools (Nukutere College, Saint Mary's School, Mauke Island and St Joseph's School, Avarua). During his tenure teacher pay parity was achieved for teachers in those schools, so that the Cook Islands Government paid them at the same rates as their counterparts in other schools. O'Connell retired in April 2011.

O'Connell died in Auckland on 2 August 2019, after a battle with cancer.

References

External links
 Catholic Hierarchy website "Bishop Stuart France O'Connell SM" (retrieved 18 February 2011). 

 

1935 births
2019 deaths
Roman Catholic bishops in the Cook Islands
People educated at St. Patrick's College, Silverstream
20th-century Roman Catholic bishops in Oceania
New Zealand people of Irish descent
People from Lower Hutt
Marist Brothers
Catholic University of America alumni
New Zealand expatriates
New Zealand Roman Catholic bishops
Roman Catholic bishops of Rarotonga
Deaths from cancer in New Zealand